A non-binding status referendum was held in Bonaire on 18 December 2015. Voters were asked "Do you agree with the current status, which is a direct link to the Netherlands?" As a majority voted no, a second referendum on the preferred status will be held.

Campaign
The "yes" campaign argued that for the vast majority, Bonaire was better off than ever before, and that a no vote would result in instability. The "no" campaign opposed the imposition of secularism by Dutch authorities, the legalisation of same-sex marriage and voluntary euthanasia, as well as claiming that there was a lack of respect for Bonaire culture.

Results

References

External links
Official website 

2015 referendums
2015
2015 in Bonaire
December 2015 events in North America